Pursuant to Article 56 of the Law on Internal Regulations of the Islamic Consultative Assembly (Parliament of the Islamic Republic of Iran), the Cultural Commission of the Islamic Consultative Assembly is formed to perform its assigned duties in the fields of culture and art, guidance and propaganda, radio and television and mass communication, physical education and youth, women and family in accordance with the provisions of the regulation.

Some of the responsibilities of this commission are:

 Conducting surveys to allocate the country's cultural budget
 Conducting surveys to allocate the country's sports budget
 Reviewing the performance and giving a vote of confidence to the ministers in the field of culture
 Review and approval of plans and bills related to the tourism industry of the country
 Review and approval of plans and bills to improve the cultural products of the country
 Review and approval of plans and bills related to cyberspace
 Inspection of cultural institutions of the country
 Review and approval of plans and bills related to the youth affairs
 Take appropriate measures to defend the culture of the country when necessary
 Review and approval of plans and bills to monitor and reduction of social harms
 Review and approval of plans and bills for the optimal implementation of sports and cultural events
 Review and approval of plans and bills to improve and monitor the media structure of the country and its products

Members 
The members of the Cultural Commission of the Islamic Consultative Assembly in the second year of the 11th term of the Assembly are as follows:

See also 
 Program, Budget and Accounting Commission of the Islamic Consultative Assembly
 Education, Research and Technology Commission of the Islamic Consultative Assembly
 Social Commission of the Islamic Consultative Assembly
 Health and Medical Commission of the Islamic Consultative Assembly
 Internal Affairs of the Country and Councils Commission of the Islamic Consultative Assembly
 Industries and Mines Commission of the Islamic Consultative Assembly
 Civil Commission of the Islamic Consultative Assembly
 The history of the parliament in Iran

References

Committees of the Iranian Parliament
Islamic Consultative Assembly